Aspidopterys is a genus of Malpighiaceae, a family of about 75 genera of flowering plants in the order Malpighiales. Aspidopterys comprises approximately 15 species of vine native to Asia.

External links
Malpighiaceae Malpighiaceae - description, taxonomy, phylogeny, and nomenclature

Malpighiaceae
Malpighiaceae genera